Dmitry Andreyevich Pletnyov (born 16 January 1998) is a Russian professional footballer who plays for Kazakhstani club FC Atyrau.

Club career
He made his debut in the Russian Football National League for FC Zenit-2 Saint Petersburg on 6 September 2017 in a game against FC Rotor Volgograd.

He made his Russian Premier League debut for FC Zenit Saint Petersburg on 5 May 2018 in a game against FC Lokomotiv Moscow.

On 18 September 2020 he signed a 3-year contract with FC Baltika Kaliningrad. He left Baltika on 7 June 2021.

International career
He played for Russia national under-17 football team at the 2015 UEFA European Under-17 Championship and 2015 FIFA U-17 World Cup.

Personal life
His father Andrei Pletnyov was also a football player.

Career statistics

References

External links
 
 
 Profile by Russian Football National League

1998 births
Living people
Footballers from Saint Petersburg
Russian footballers
Association football midfielders
Russia youth international footballers
FC Zenit-2 Saint Petersburg players
FC Zenit Saint Petersburg players
FC Tom Tomsk players
FC Baltika Kaliningrad players
FC Dynamo Saint Petersburg players
FC Atyrau players
Russian Premier League players
Russian First League players
Russian Second League players
Kazakhstan Premier League players
Russian expatriate footballers
Expatriate footballers in Kazakhstan
Russian expatriate sportspeople in Kazakhstan